Murilo Rufino Barbosa (born 27 May 1983), known professionally as Lilo, is a Brazilian footballer who currently plays as a midfielder for the Guyanese football club Alpha United.

Career
Murilo began his playing career with Associação Esportiva Araçatuba in Campeonato Paulista Série A3 at age 19.

References

1983 births
Living people
Brazilian footballers
Brazilian expatriate footballers
Pogoń Szczecin players
Brazilian expatriate sportspeople in Poland
Expatriate footballers in Poland
Bałtyk Gdynia players
Alpha United FC players
Clube Atlético Votuporanguense players
Morvant Caledonia United players
Association football midfielders